Trevor Smith (born 15 April 1949) is a retired field hockey player from Australia, who was a member of the national team that won the silver medal at the 1976 Summer Olympics in Montreal, Quebec, Canada.  He also went to the 1984 Summer Olympics in Los Angeles, where the Australian team missed the medals, finishing fourth.

Personal
Trevor was involved with the business Hockeyworld along with younger brothers Roger Smith and Terry Smith who also played hockey for Australia.

Field hockey

International hockey

He made his Olympic debut at the 1976 Summer Olympics in Montreal where the Kookaburras won a silver medal and also performed at the 1984 Summer Olympics.

References

External links
 

1949 births
Living people
Australian male field hockey players
Olympic field hockey players of Australia
Olympic silver medalists for Australia
Field hockey players at the 1976 Summer Olympics
Field hockey players at the 1984 Summer Olympics
Place of birth missing (living people)
Olympic medalists in field hockey
Medalists at the 1976 Summer Olympics